A list of loanwords from the Italian language into the Portuguese language, also called italianisms. According to the Dicionário Universal da Lingua Portuguesa, there are 535 known and registered italianisms in the Portuguese language.

A
ágio (agio)
alarme (all'arme) - en.: alarm
alerta (all'erta) - en.: alert
andante (andante)
antepasto (antipasto)
arcada (arcate) - en.: arcade
ária (aria)
aquarela (acquarella) - en.: watercolour
arlequim (Arlecchino)
arpejo (arpeggio)

B
bagatela (bagatella) - en.: bagatelle
baldaquim (baldacchino)
banquete (banchetta) - en.: banquet
barista (barista)
batalhão (battaglione) - en.: battalion
batuta (battuta)
belvedere (belvedere)
bisonho (bisogno)
boletim (bollettino) - en.: bulletin
bravata (bravata)
brócolo (broccoli)
bufão (buffone) - en.: buffoon

C
camerlengo (camerlengo)
cantata (cantata)
capricho (capriccio)
capuchino (cappuccino)
caricatura (caricatura)
carnaval (carnevale) - en.: carnival
carpete (carpita) - en.: carpet
carroça (carrozza)
carroceria (carrozzeria)
cartucho (cartoccio) - en.: cartridge
cascata (cascata) - en.: cascade
cassino (casino)
charlatão (ciarlatano)
ciabata (ciabatta)
cicerone (cicerone)
comparsa (comparsa)
concerto (concerto)
contralto (contralto)
coronel (colonnello) - en.: colonel
cortejar (corteggiare) - en.: courting
cortesã (cortigiana) - en.: courtesan

D
desenho (disegno) - en.: design
desfaçatez (sfacciatezza)
diletante (dilettante)
diva (diva)
doge (doge)
dona (donna)
domo (duomo) - en.: dome
dueto (duetto) - en.: duet

E
embrulho (imbroglio)
entalhe (intaglio)
empresário (impresario)
esbirro (sbirro)
esboço (sbozzo)
escaramuça (scaramuccia)
escopeta (scopetta)
escorchar (scorciare)
esdrúxulo (sdrucciolo)
esfumar (sfumare)
esparguete (spaghetti)
esquadra (squadra) - en.: squad
esquadrão (squadrone) - en.: squadron
esquete (schizzo) - en.: sketch
esquife (schifo) - en.: skiff
esquifoso (schifoso)
estafar (staffare)
estafermo
estância (stanza)
 (stiletto)
estravagância (stravaganza)
estropear (stroppiare)
estudio (studio)
estuque (stucco)
 (espresso)

F
fachada (facciata) - en.: facade
faiança (Faenza)
fanal (fanale)
farsa (farce) - en.: farce
fascismo (fascismo) - en.: fascism
feltro (feltro) - en.: felt
festa (festa) - en.: fest, party
festejar (festeggiare)
fiasco (fare fiasco) - en.: fiasco
filigrana (filigrana)
fólio (foglio)
fosso (fosso)
fragata (fregata) - en.: frigate
fresco (fresco)
fuga (fuga)

G
galeria (galleria) - en.: wikt:gallery
gazeta (gazzetta) - en.: gazette
gesso (gesso)
girafa (giraffa) - en.: giraffe
gôndola (gondola)
grafite (graffiti)
granito (granito) - en.: granite
grotesco (grottesco) - en.: grotesque
grupo (gruppo) - en.: group
gueto (ghetto)

H

I
Índigo (indaco) - en.: indigo
infantaria (infanteria) - en.: infantry
inferno (inferno)
informática (informatica) - informatics

L
laguna (laguna)
lasanha (lasagna)
lava (lava)
lazareto (lazaretto) - en.: lazaret
libreto (libretto)
loja (loggia)
loteria (lotteria) - lottery

M
macarrão (maccherone) - en.: macaroni
madona (madonna)
madrigal (madrigale) - en.:  madrigal
maestro (maestro)
máfia (mafia)
mafioso (mafioso)
magazine (magazzino) - en.: magazine
magenta (Magenta)
magnífico (magnifico) - en.: magnificent
malandro (malandrino)
malária (malaria)
maneirismo (manierismo) - en.: mannerism
maquiavélico (macchiavellico)
marrasquino (maraschino)
medalha (medaglia) - en.: medal
melodrama (melodramma) - en.: melodrama
merengue (Marengo)
mezanino (mezzanino) - en.: mezzanine
miniatura (miniatura) - en.: miniature
moçarela (mozzarella)
modelo (modello) - en.: model
mortadela (mortadella)
mosquete (moschetto) - en.: musket
mussolina (mussolina) - en.: muslin

N
namorado (innamorato) - en.: enamored
neutrino (neutrino)
nhoque (gnocchi)

O
ocarina (ocarina)

P
palhaço (pagliaccio) - en.: clown
panetone (panettone)
parmesão (parmigiano) - en.: parmesan
partitura (partitura)
pastiche (pasticcio)
pérola (perla) - en.: pearl
pedante (pedante) - en.: pedant
pelagra (pellagra)
peperone (peperoni)
pergola (pergola)
piano (piano)
pícolo (piccolo)
pilastra (pilastro) - en.: pilaster
piloto (pilota) - pilot
pistáquio (pistacchio)
pistola (Pistoia)
pizza (pizza)
pizzaria (pizzeria)
polenta (polenta)
Porcelana (porcellana) - en.: porcelain
 (portafoglio) - en.: portfolio
postilhão (postiglione) - en.: postillion
propaganda (propaganda)
provolone (provolone)

Q

R
raça (razza) - race
ravióli (ravioli)
regata (regata)
ricota (ricotta)
risoto (risotto)
rúcula (rughetta)

S
salame (salame)
salsicha (salsicce)
saltimbanco (saltimbanco)
sedã (sede) - en.: sedan
semolina (semolino) - en.: semolina
sentinela (sentinella) - en.: sentinel
serenata (serenata)
siena (Siena)
sinfonia (sinfonia) - en.: symphony
solfejo (solfeggio)
solo (solo)
sonata (sonata)
soneto (sonneto) = en.: sonnet
soprano (soprano)

T
tafetá (taffettà)
talharim (taglierini)
tarô (tarocchi) - tarot
tchau (ciao)
tenor (tenore) - en.: tenor
terracota (terracotta)
tômbola (tombola)
torso (torso)
trampolim (trampolino) - en.: trampoline
travertino (travertino) - en.: travertine
trombone (trombone)
truco (trucco)
tutifrúti (tutti-frutti)

U

V
viola (viola)
violino (violino)
violoncelo (violoncello)

Z
zero (zero)

Sources
Partially extracted and translated from: Sabbatini, R.M.E.: Contribuições do Idioma Italiano ao Português: Estrangeirismos que Ficaram. Monografia, Instituto Edumed, Campinas, Agosto 2007 (reproduced by permission of the author). Available on the Internet (In Portuguese).
 Dicionário Universal da Lingua Portuguesa. Editora Priberam, Portugal. Available on the Internet

Italian
Portuguese